True Love is an upcoming American science fiction film directed, written and co-produced by Gareth Edwards. The film stars John David Washington, Gemma Chan, Ralph Ineson, Allison Janney, and Ken Watanabe.

True Love is scheduled to be released in the United States on October 6, 2023, by 20th Century Studios.

Cast
 John David Washington
 Gemma Chan
 Allison Janney
 Ralph Ineson
 Ken Watanabe
 Sturgill Simpson
 Marc Menchaca

Production 
In February 2020, Gareth Edwards signed on to direct and write an untitled science fiction project for New Regency, along with Rogue One (2016) co-producer Kiri Hart serving as producer. In May 2021, John David Washington was announced to star and the film's title was revealed to be True Love. In June 2021, Gemma Chan, Danny McBride, and Benedict Wong entered negotiations to star. The involvements of Chan and Wong were confirmed in January 2022, with Allison Janney, Sturgill Simpson, and Marc Menchaca joining the cast. Simpson was reported to be taking over for McBride who departed due to scheduling conflicts. In February 2022, Ken Watanabe joined the cast to replace Wong, who also had to drop out due to scheduling conflicts; Watanabe had previously worked with Edwards on Godzilla (2014).

Filming began in Thailand on January 17, 2022, with Greig Fraser and Oren Soffer serving as cinematographers. Principal photography on the film wrapped on May 30, 2022.

Release
The film is scheduled to be released on October 6, 2023.

References

External links 
 

2023 drama films
2023 science fiction films
2020s American films
2020s English-language films
2020s science fiction drama films
20th Century Studios films
American science fiction drama films
Films directed by Gareth Edwards
Films scored by Michael Giacchino
Films shot in Thailand
Red Granite Pictures films
Regency Enterprises films
Upcoming English-language films